Father Dickson Cemetery is a historic African-American cemetery located on 845 South Sappington Road in Crestwood, St. Louis County, Missouri.

It has been listed as one of the National Register of Historic Places since October 6, 2021.

History 
The cemetery is named after abolitionist Moses Dickson, who is buried at this cemetery. It sits on more than 12 acres and roughly 12,000 people are buried there. Many of the burials include black military veterans, leaders within the Underground Railroad network, formerly enslaved people, and lynching victims.

In 1988, the Friends of Father Dickson Cemetery group was started in hopes of maintaining the aging cemetery and preserving history. Other nearby historic African American cemetery include Washington Park Cemetery (1920), Quinette Cemetery (1866), and Greenwood Cemetery (1874).

Notable burials 
 Moses Dickson (1824–1901), his body was moved here in 1903 with the dedication of the cemetery.
 Henry Q. "Steamboat" Lewis (1886–1965)
 Pinetop Sparks (1910–1935), he was buried in an unmarked grave, a headstone was added in 2014.
 James Milton Turner (1840–1915)

See also 
 List of cemeteries in the United States
 National Register of Historic Places listings in St. Louis County, Missouri

References

External links

 

1903 establishments in Missouri
Cemeteries on the National Register of Historic Places in Missouri
Cemeteries in Missouri
African-American cemeteries
History of St. Louis County, Missouri
African-American history in St. Louis